The 2010–11 Detroit Red Wings season was the 85th season of play for the National Hockey League franchise that was established on September 25, 1926, and saw the Red Wings equal the Dallas Cowboys (from 1966 to 1985) in second place for the most consecutive winning seasons in major North American professional sports.

Off season
The 2010 Detroit Red Wings off-season saw the acquisitions of Joey MacDonald from the Anaheim Ducks and Mike Modano from the Dallas Stars. In the 2010 NHL Entry Draft, the Red Wings picked Riley Sheahan out of the University of Notre Dame for their first round pick. The Red Wings looked to improve off of their 44–24–14 record in the 2009–10 season and make the Stanley Cup playoffs for the 20th consecutive season.

Regular season
On January 18, Nicklas Lidstrom was voted by the players to represent one of the teams as captain during the 2011 NHL All-Star Game.

Divisional standings

Conference standings

Schedule and results

Playoffs
The Detroit Red Wings have qualified for the Stanley Cup playoffs for the 20th consecutive season. The Red Wings currently hold the longest current streak of post-season appearances in all of North American professional sports.

 *Denotes if necessary

Player statistics

Skaters
Note: GP = Games played; G = Goals; A = Assists; Pts = Points; +/− = Plus/minus; PIM = Penalty minutes

Goaltenders 
Note: GP = Games played; TOI = Time on ice (minutes); W = Wins; L = Losses; OT = Overtime losses; GA = Goals against; SO = Shutouts; Sv% = Save percentage; GAA = Goals against average

†Denotes player spent time with another team before joining Red Wings. Stats reflect time with the Red Wings only.
‡Traded mid-season
Bold/italics denotes franchise record

Awards and records

Awards

Milestones

Transactions
The Red Wings have been involved in the following transactions during the 2010–11 season.

Trades

|}

Free agents acquired

Free agents lost

Claimed via waivers

Lost via waivers

Lost via retirement

Player signings

Draft picks 

The 2010 NHL Entry Draft was held in Los Angeles on June 25–26, 2010.

See also 
 2010–11 NHL season

Farm teams 
The Grand Rapids Griffins remain Detroit's American Hockey League (AHL) affiliate in 2010–11 and the Toledo Walleye will become the team's ECHL affiliate in 2010–11.

References

External links
2010–11 Detroit Red Wings season at ESPN
2010–11 Detroit Red Wings season at Hockey Reference

Detroit Red Wings seasons
Detroit Red Wings season, 2010-11
Detroit
Detroit Red
Detroit Red